Robert Holgate (1481/1482 – 1555) was Bishop of Llandaff from 1537 and then Archbishop of York (from 1545 to 1554). He recognised Henry VIII as head of the Church of England.

Although a protege of Thomas Cromwell, 1st Earl of Essex, Holgate had a career in the Gilbertine Order of which he became master.  He was briefly Prior of Watton until the priory was dissolved in 1539. Most of the Gilbertine houses were lesser establishments which should have been dissolved under the Suppression of Religious Houses Act 1535 (only four out of twenty-six houses had revenues over £200 a year). However, Holgate is credited with using his influence to save them for a few years. For example, Malton Priory, one of the lesser Gilbertine houses, was the last of them to surrender in December 1539, whereas Sempringham Priory, worth more than £200 a year, surrendered in 1538.

Holgate was consecrated as Bishop of Llandaff on 25 March 1537. He translated to York on 16 January 1545. At York in 1546, he founded a school, now called Archbishop Holgate's School.

He was President of the Council of the North from 1538.

In 1550 Holgate married Barbara Wentworth, who was about 25 at the time. This might, however have been a second wedding to make it fully legal, and Holgate and Wentworth might have first married in late 1547 with Roger Tongue officiating. In 1551 Anthony Norman claimed that he was already married to Barbara Wentworth, but the courts decided that their marriage when she was about seven had not been a binding legal transaction. Robert and Barbara remained married until 1553, when shortly after Mary I of England came to the throne. She imprisoned Holgate on various charges, with his being a married cleric being central to these. In 1554 Holgate renounced his marriage claiming he had only entered it to avoid suspicion as a papist. In January 1555 Holgate was released from prison, but he was not restored to priestly office.  He died later that year.

In 1558 a Robert Holgate from Yorkshire entered the University of Cambridge.  He may have been a son of Holgate, since there are some claims he had two children by Barbara, but there is no conclusive evidence on the matter.

References
This article contains public domain text from William Page's Houses of the Gilbertine order: The priory of Sempringham, A History of the County of Lincoln: Volume 2 (1906)

External links
Archbishop Holgate's School
H.L. Parish, ‘Holgate, Robert (1481/2–1555)’, Oxford Dictionary of National Biography, Oxford University Press, 2004, accessed 5 June 2007

Archbishops of York
Bishops of Llandaff
16th-century Welsh Anglican bishops
1480s births
1555 deaths
Gilbertine Order